Catalana  is a genus of moths of the family Noctuidae. The genus was erected by Pierre Viette in 1954.

Species
 Catalana sandrangato Viette, 1961
 Catalana vohilava Viette, 1954

References

Further reading
 

Calpinae